Leslie Ann Sykes (born June 27, 1965) is an American television news anchor, journalist and reporter. Sykes is the morning and midday co-anchor of the "Eyewitness News" at KABC-TV, ABC's owned and operated television station in Los Angeles.

Early life
Leslie Ann Sykes was born in San Diego, California to Abel Baxton Sykes, Jr. (June 1, 1934 - December 19, 2012) and Sylvia Mae Thierry Sykes. She has two older sisters; Dawn Carol Sykes and Daphne Grace Sykes. She grew up in Compton, California, where her father worked as an administrator for Compton Community College. Sykes attended St. Joseph High School (Lakewood, California) and then went to Spelman College in Atlanta, Georgia where she majored and has a degree in English. While there, she made her film debut  as "Miss Mission" in Spike Lee's 1988 film, School Daze.

Career
Upon graduation, Sykes began her professional career as a journalist. One of her first jobs was as a general assignment reporter at the now defunct Los Angeles Herald-Examiner. An internship followed at local independent television station (now My Network TV affiliate) KCOP-TV. This led to a desk assistant position in the news department at Fox affiliate KTTV.

Her big break came when she landed her first on-air job in Hattiesburg, Mississippi at WDAM-TV. Not only did she serve as a reporter, she anchored three shows a day and produced a newscast. From there she received her first major market assignment at WVUE-TV in New Orleans, Louisiana. In December 1994, Sykes returned to Los Angeles as a general assignment reporter for KABC-TV's "Eyewitness News" program.

In late 1998, Sykes was approached by WBBM-TV in Chicago to become its new top female weekend anchor, replacing Sarah Lucero. However, a December 3, 1998 article in the Chicago Sun-Times reported that She had opted "to stay put in L.A."

In June 1999, Sykes was promoted to co-anchor the weekend edition of the "Eyewitness News". In 2009, she was promoted again to co-anchor of the 11am-Noon slot and then joined the team on "Eyewitness News This Morning" as well.

Personal life
Sykes is married to Patrick W. Spann. They have a son and currently  live in the View Park-Windsor Hills neighborhood of Los Angeles.

References

External links
 Leslie Sykes' bio on KABC-TV website

1965 births
Living people
African-American television personalities
American television journalists
African-American women journalists
African-American journalists
African-American writers
American women television journalists
Spelman College alumni
People from Compton, California
Television anchors from Los Angeles
Television anchors from New Orleans
People from San Diego
Journalists from California
People from View Park–Windsor Hills, California